Murchadh mac Aodha (died 960) was 33rd King of Uí Maine.

Reign and events
Murchadh's reign is obscure. Some of the events recorded in Uí Maine, Connacht and Ireland during his lifetime include:

 940.Cluain-mic-Nois (Clonmacnoise) and Cill-dara (Kildare) were plundered by Blacaire, son of Godfrey, and the foreigners of Ath-cliath (Dublin) [and] A great flood in this year, so that the lower half of Cluain-mic-Nois was swept away by the water.
 943.Two pillars of fire were a week before Allhallowtide, and they illumined the whole world.
 945.A battle between the birds of the sea and the birds of the land at Luimneach (Limerick).
 948.The plundering of Magh Finn by Conghalach.
 949.The spoiling of Siol Anmchadha, and the plundering of Cluain-fearta-Brenainn (Clonfert), by Ceallachan and the men of Munster.
 956.Áed mac Cellaig, successor of Brenainn (Abbot of Clonfert)... died.
 959.A bolt of fire passed south-westwards through Leinster, and it killed a thousand persons and flocks as far as Ath-cliath.

References

 Annals of Ulster at CELT: Corpus of Electronic Texts at University College Cork
 Annals of Tigernach at CELT: Corpus of Electronic Texts at University College Cork
Revised edition of McCarthy's synchronisms at Trinity College Dublin.
 Byrne, Francis John (2001), Irish Kings and High-Kings, Dublin: Four Courts Press, 

960 deaths
People from County Galway
People from County Roscommon
10th-century Irish monarchs
Kings of Uí Maine
Year of birth unknown